Stapleton is a small village and civil parish in Herefordshire near the border town of Presteigne in Wales. The parish borders on Willey, Kinsham and Presteigne. Stapleton is surrounded by farmland. Bryan's Ground gardens are open to the public.

History
In 1144, when the lord of Richard's Castle was expelled from Presteigne, he built the castle in Stapleton which remains today. It became the centre of his lordship in the Welsh Marches. During the Middle Ages, Stapleton was more important than Presteigne.

In 2006, an archaeological excavation in a field found ancient remains.

References

Civil parishes in Herefordshire